Regina  (born Irena Jalšovec, 4 July 1965, Murska Sobota, Yugoslavia — now Slovenia) is a Slovenian singer, best known for her participation in the 1996 Eurovision Song Contest.

Pop workshop 
Regina has made 3 appearances in the Pop workshop (Pop delavnica).
 1988: Vem
 1989: Ne vabi me
 1993: Srečo ti želim

Yamaha 
Regina appeared with the song Joey. She achieved 4th place.

EMA (Slovenia) 
Regina has made eight appearances in the Slovenian Eurovision Song Contest selection, EMA, as follows:
 1993: Naj ljubezen združi vse ljudi (Aleksander Kogoj – Aleksander Kogoj – Mojmir Sepe) – 4th (70 points)
 1996: Dan najlepših sanj (Aleksander Kogoj – Aleksander Kogoj – Jože Privšek) – 1st (118 points)
 1998: Glas gora (Aleksander Kogoj – Aleksander Kogoj – Aleksander Kogoj) – 3rd (5.694 televotes)
 2001: Zaljubljena v maj (Aleksander Kogoj – Marko Slokar – Patrik Greblo) – 8th (6 points)
 2002: Ljubezen daje moč (Aleksander Kogoj – Aleksander Kogoj – Sašo Fajon) 
 2004: Plave očij (Aleksander Kogoj – Feri Lainšček – Tomaž Kozlevčar) – 10th (3 points)
 2005: Proti vetru (Aleksander Kogoj, Damjan Pančur – Feri Lainšček – Damjan Pančur) – critics' award, 9th (2.514 televotes)
 2016: Alive in Every Way (Aleksander Kogoj, Jon Dobrun – Jon Dobrun – Aleksander Kogoj) 
The success of "Dan najlepših sanj" in 1996 earned Regina the right to represent Slovenia in the 41st Eurovision Song Contest. The song survived the audio-only pre-qualifying round held in March that year, but at the contest itself, held in Oslo on 18 May, could only manage to place 21st of the 23 entries.

Slovenian song festival 
 1998: Sončna ljubezen
 1999: Ujemi moj nasmeh – award for the best production
 2000: Moje ime – 3rd, winner in the opinion of the jury, award for the best representation of the music video (with Gloria)
 2002: Moja zemlja
 2003: Čaša ljubezni – with Diego Barrios Ross
 2005: Gabriel – 10th (1034 telephone votes)
 2006: Demoni
 2009: Poljubi me – 8th (477 telephone votes)
 2011: Tebe ni – 6th (7 points)

Albums discography 
Regina has released ten albums.
 Regina (1988)
 Novo leto
 Ave Maria (1991) 
 Liza ljubi jazz (1994)
Liza ljubi jazz, Smoke on the water, Style, DD & D, Be a woman, Tokyo night, Čarovnik, Joey, Šok, Srečo ti želim AND Naj ljubezen združi vse ljudi
 Religija ljubezni (1995)
Religija ljubezni, Bodi tu, Anergija, Anergija (disco mix), Am ban pet podgan, Pravljična ljubezen, Party za ples, Čakam te, Canzonni, Bodi tu, Religija ljubezni (dance mix), Fido, Heidi, Religija ljubezni (karaoke), Anergija (karaoke), Bodi tu (karaoke) AND Pravljična ljubezen (karaoke)
 Dan najlepših sanj – Eurosong '96 – Slovenian entry (1996)
Dan najlepših sanj, The brightest day, Liza ljubi jazz, Bodi tu, Be a woman AND Dan najlepših sanj (karaoke)
 Dan najlepših sanj
Dan najlepših sanj, Bodi tu, Pravljična ljubezen, Religija ljubezni, Be a woman, Naj ljubezen združi vse ljudi, Am ban pet podgan, Čakam te, Heidi AND Dan najlepših sanj (karaoke)
 Moje ime (2000) (HER BEST-SELLING ALBUM)
Moje ime (Aleksander Kogoj), Glas gora, Ne ori, Ujemi moj nasmeh (Aleksander Kogoj, Milan Dekleva AND Sašo Fajon), Sončna ljubezen (Aleksander Kogoj, Hana Štupar AND Patrik Greblo), Dan najlepših sanj, Naj ljubezen združi vse ljudi, Liza ljubi jazz, Pravljična ljubezen AND Bodi tu
 Čaša ljubezi (2003)
Čaša ljubezni (with Diego Barrios Ross) (Aleksander Kogoj, Štefan Miljevič AND Aleš Avbelj), Zaljubljena v maj, Moja zemlja (Aleksander Kogoj AND Štefan Miljevič), Mama, Novo leto, Ljubezen daje moč, Moj medvedek, Razprla bom dlani, Ne ori, Daleč gre srce (with Alexander Brown) AND En sam utrip
 Tebe pa ni (2012)
Tebe pa ni (Aleksander Kogoj, Damjan Pančur, Feri Lainšček AND Lojze Krajnčan), Izgubljeni čas, Poljubi me (Damjan Pančur, Aleksander Kogoj, Feri Lainšček AND Tomaž Grintal), Demoni (Damjan Pančur, Aleksander Kogoj, Feri Lainšček AND Aleš Avbelj), Gabriel (Damjan Pančur, Aleksander Kogoj AND Feri Lainšček), Proti vetru, Plave očij, Pozabi me, Dan najlepših sanj (R&B), Moje ime, Glas gora AND Ujemi moj nasmeh
 Ljubezen beži (2015)
Ljubezen beži; Pokliči ljubezen; Ritem ulice

Compilations 
 CD Protest
 Slovenska popevka 98
 Daleč je – uglasbena prekmurska poezija (1999)
 EMA 2001
 EMA 2002
 Vroče uspešnice 2002
 Slovenska popevka 2003
 Ema 04
 Ema '05
 Slovenska popevka 2005
 Slovenska popevka 2006
 Festival narečnih popevk 2007
 Slovenska popevka 2009
 Slovenska popevka 2011
 Murske balade in romance (2012)
 Val 202 plus! Vol. 4 (2013)

Official music videos 
 1994: Liza ljubi jazz
 1995: Bodi tu
 1996: Dan najlepših sanj
 1998: Glas gora
 1999: Ujemi moj nasmeh
 2000: Moje ime
 2002: Moja zemlja
 2003: Čaša ljubezni
 2004: Plave očij
 2005: Gabriel
 2009: Poljubi me
 2013: Pokliči ljubezen
 2015: Ljubezen beži

Music charts in Slovenia 
Popular songs on the Slovenian music charts were Naj ljubezen združi vse ljudi (Let love unite all the people), Liza ljubi jazz (Liza loves jazz), Dan najlepših sanj (The day of the most beautiful dreams) and Moje ime (My name).
 1997: Dan najlepših sanj – 19th
 2000: Moje ime – 37th
 2007: Dan najlepših sanj – +300th
 2008: Dan najlepših sanj – 151st
 2009: Dan najlepših sanj – 194th
 2010: Dan najlepših sanj – 491st
 2011: Dan najlepših sanj – 187th
 2012: Dan najlepših sanj – 417th
 2013
 Pokliči ljubezen: 74th
 Ritem ulice: 98th

MTV 2005 
The official music video of a song Gabriel was premiered on MTV 2005.

Singles 
 1988: Vem 
 1989: Ne vabi me
 1993: Naj ljubezen združi vse ljudi, Srečo ti želim
 1994: Liza ljubi jazz
 1995: Bodi tu, Religija ljubezni
 1996: Dan najlepših sanj
 1998: Glas gora, Sončna ljubezen
 1999: Ujemi moj nasmeh
 2000: Moje ime
 2001: Zaljubljena v maj
 2002: Ljubezen daje moč, Moja zemlja
 2003: Čaša ljubezni
 2004: Plave očij
 2005: Proti vetru, Gabriel
 2006: Demoni
 2007: Tvoje očij
 2008: Dan najlepših sanj (R&B)
 2009: Poljubi me
 2010: Izgubljeni čas
 2011: Tebe ni
 2012: Tebe pa ni
 2013: Ritem ulice, Pokliči ljubezen, Moje sanje
 2015: Ljubezen beži
 2016: Alive in Every Way, Naglas

Personal life

She is married to Aleksander Kogoj, who has written most of her songs. They have a son together.

References

External links 

  (Slovenian)
 Programme notes from ESC 1996 at Esctoday
 Regina on YouTube
 REGINA: Facebook

1965 births
Living people
People from Murska Sobota
21st-century Slovenian women singers
Eurovision Song Contest entrants for Slovenia
Eurovision Song Contest entrants of 1996
20th-century Slovenian women singers
Yugoslav women singers